Marie Luise Bulst-Thiele (1906–1992) was a German historian, known for writing about the Knights Templar. Her works are often cited by other medieval historians in their discussions of Templar historiography. In his own work Trial of the Templars, British historian Malcolm Barber discusses Bulst-Thiele's views on the Templars, as that she sees the attack on the Knights Templar as an integral element of the relations between the administration of King Philip IV of France and the Papacy. (Barber, p. 300). With Walther Bulst she had four sons, among them  Neithard Bulst (born 1941), history professor in Bielefeld.

Works
 Sacrae Domus Militiae Templi, 1974
 Kaiserin Agnes, 1933
 Aristoteles im Mittelalter und Vergilius im Mittelalter, 1932
 "Templer in königlichen und päpstlichen Diensten." In Festschrift Percy Ernst Schramm: zu seinem siebzigsten Geburtstag von Schülern und Freunden zugeeignet, edited by Peter Classen, Peter Scheibert. Wiesbaden: Steiner, 1964.
 "Warum wollte Philipp IV. den Templerorden vernichten? Ein neuer Aspekt." In I Templari: Mito e Storia, edited by G. Minnucci. Sinalunga, 1989.
 "The Influence of St. Bernard of Clairvaux on the Formation of the Order of the Knights Templar." In The Second Crusade and the Cistercians, edited by Michael Gervers, 57-65. New York: St. Martin’s Press, 1992.
 "Die Anfänge des Templerordens. Bernhard von Clairvaux. Cîteaux" (The Beginnings of the Templars Order. Bernhard of Clairvaux. Citeaux, 1993

References

 Alain Demurger, The Last Templar
 Malcolm Barber, Trial of the Templars, 2nd ed. p. 300
 "The Social Context of the Templars", Malcolm Barber, Transactions of the Royal Historical Society, 5th Ser., Vol. 34, 1984, pp. 27–46

1906 births
1992 deaths
German medievalists
Women medievalists
Historians of the Knights Templar
20th-century German historians
20th-century German women writers
20th-century German writers
German women historians